"Who Dat Girl" is a song by American rapper Flo Rida. It features American singer Akon. The song was written by Flo Rida, Dr. Luke, Claude Kelly, Benny Blanco, Bruno Mars, and Philip Lawrence, and it was produced by Dr. Luke and Benny Blanco. It was released on January 11, 2011 as the third single from Flo Rida's third studio album, Only One Flo (Part 1). It peaked at number twenty-nine on the Billboard Hot 100.

Chart performance
The song debuted at number fifty-five on the Billboard Hot 100 on the issue dated November 18, 2010. On the issue date of January 22, 2011, the song charted at number thirty-nine on the chart, selling 63,000 digital copies. The following week the song peaked at number twenty-nine, becoming his eighth top-thirty single. In Australia, the track debuted at No. 29 on April 4, 2011, and peaked at No. 10 in its fifth week on the chart.

Music video
The music video was directed by Ray Kay. It premiered on December 2, 2010 on MTV. He shows his friend a picture of a girl on his laptop, and the friend accidentally spills liquid on it. The girl pops out of the laptop and throws a party at their house, like in the film Weird Science. In the video, Flo-Rida and Akon seem to be at a club scene, in which they are dancing with a few fairly good-looking ladies, covered in some substance in which looks like glow in the dark paint.

Critical response
Lewis Corner of Digital Spy UK gave the song a negative review, giving the single 2 out of 5 stars, stating "Flo Rida's chart luck has been down of late, what with his last effort – and first solo track – just missing out on a spot in the top 40. His solution? Call in the big guns – in this instance Akon to launch him back to the top – and given that Flo considers himself the old-fashioned romantic sort at heart, there are no prizes for guessing which rapper  on his latest effort.

What's more, he's even roped in serial hitmaker Dr Luke to helm the track, who supplies a ready-made rubbery electro-R&B hook with a beat peeled off the 'California Gurls' cutting room floor. 'I imagine her topless/ she might set off my rocket,' Rida announces with a conviction that would make even Hugh Hefner blush, as Akon confesses his lass 'ain't no actress/ But she makes movies.' Who said romance was dead?"

Personnel
Songwriting – Flo Rida, Dr. Luke, Claude Kelly, Benjamin Levin, Bruno Mars, Philip Lawrence
Production, instruments and programming – Dr. Luke, Benny Blanco
Vocals – Flo Rida, Akon
Engineering – Emily Wright, Chris "Tek" O'Ryan, Sam Holland
Assistant engineering – Tatiana Gottwald
Mixing – Serban Ghenea
Mix engineer – John Hanes
Assistant mix engineer – Tim Roberts
Background vocals – Claude Kelly
Remix Package – 8barz 8barz Music, LLC
Source:

Charts and certifications

Weekly charts

Year-end charts

Certifications

References

2010 singles
Flo Rida songs
Akon songs
Songs written by Dr. Luke
Songs written by Claude Kelly
Songs written by Benny Blanco
Songs written by Bruno Mars
Song recordings produced by Dr. Luke
Song recordings produced by Benny Blanco
Music videos directed by Ray Kay
2010 songs
Songs written by Philip Lawrence (songwriter)
Songs written by Flo Rida